Muṣʿab ibn ʿUmayr also known as Muṣʿab al-Khayr ("the Good") was a sahabi (companion) of Muhammad. From the Banū ʿAbd al-Dār branch of the Quraysh, he embraced Islam in 614 CE and was the first ambassador of Islam. He died in the Battle of Uhud in 625 CE.

Early life 
Mus‘ab ibn Umair was born to the Banū 'Abd al-Dār branch of the quraish tribe. His exact birth year is not known; it is believed that he was born sometime between 594 and 598 CE since he was very young when he embraced Islam in 614. Mus‘ab was the son of Umayr ibn Hashim and Khunas bint Malik, and his parents were wealthy. Even as a young man, he was permitted to attend meetings of the Quraysh elders.

Conversion to Islam 
The first Muslims used to meet with Muhammad at the house of Al-Arqam known as the Islamic Learning Center. Mus'ab became interested and went to this house to find out more about Islam. As a result of hearing the reciting of the Qur'an and the preaching of Muhammad, he converted.

At first Mus'ab kept his faith a secret, for he was afraid of how his mother would react. However, one day, Uthman ibn Talha, saw him entering Al Arqam's house and joining the Muslim prayers. The news spread and eventually reached his mother, who chained him in their house with the intention of making him recant. Mus'ab was confident in his faith and would not renounce it. Muhammad advised him to join the companions who were emigrating to Abyssinia so that he would not be harassed again.

First Ambassador of Islam 
Mus‘ab ibn Umayr was appointed the first ambassador of Islam and was sent to Yathrib (Medina) to prepare the city for the forthcoming Hijra after the first pledge with the ansar. A man of Medina named Asad ibn Zurarah assisted him. After they had preached Islam, many residents of Medina were converted, including Sa'd ibn Mu'adh, Usayd ibn Hudayr and Sa'd ibn Ubadah. The Medinan converts were known as Ansars ("helpers").

Military campaigns

Battle of Badr
He participated in the Battle of Badr. Muhammad’s forces included Ali, Hamza, Mus`ab ibn `Umair, Az-Zubair bin Al-'Awwam, Ammar ibn Yasir, and Abu Dharr al-Ghifari. The Muslims also brought seventy camels and two horses, meaning that they either had to walk or fit three to four men per camel. However, many early Muslim sources indicate that no serious fighting was expected, and the future Caliph Uthman stayed behind to care for his sick wife Ruqayyah, the daughter of Muhammad. Salman the Persian also could not join the battle, as he was still not a free man.

Many of the Quraishi nobles, including Amr ibn Hishām, Walid ibn Utba, Shaiba, and Umayah ibn Khalaf, joined the Meccan army. Their reasons varied: some were out to protect their financial interests in the caravan; others wanted to avenge Ibn al-Hadrami, the guard killed at Nakhlah; finally, a few must have wanted to take part in what was expected to be an easy victory against the Muslims. Amr ibn Hishām is described as shaming at least one noble, Umayah ibn Khalaf, into joining the expedition.

Death in the Battle of Uhud

In the Battle of Uhud in 624 CE, Muhammad assigned Mus'ab ibn Umayr to carry the Muslim flag. During the battle, some Muslims, who were under the impression that the battle was over, left their positions on the battlefield, giving the opposing forces hope of attacking Muhammad himself. On realizing the danger, Mus'ab, who was of a similar position and colouring to Muhammad, raised his flag and shouted the takbir ("Allah (God) is The Greatest!"), with the intention of diverting the enemies' attention towards himself and allowing Muhammad to remain unhurt. Mus'ab was attacked, and his right hand was severed holding the flag, but he continued to repeat the words of the Quran, and took the flag in his left hand.
When his left hand was severed he took hold of it with his arms but never let the flag fall. "Muhammad PBUH is only a Messenger of God. Messengers have passed away before him." (Qur'an, 3:144) Eventually Musab was hit by a spear thrown by Ibn Qami'ah and died.

Burial 
Sixty-five Muslims were killed in the battle. Khabbab ibn al-Aratt narrated:  Muhammad stood beside Musab's body and recited: "Among the believers are men who have been true to what they have pledged to God. The Messenger of God testifies that you are martyrs in the sight of God." When Mus'ab's wife, Hammanah bint Jahsh, heard about the death of her brother and maternal uncle, she replied, "To Allah we belong and to him we will verily return. I ask Allah's forgiveness for him." But when she heard about the death of her husband Mus'ab, she shouted and cried.

See also 
Sunni view of the Sahaba
List of Sahabah
List of expeditions of Muhammad
Banu Hashim
Saʽd ibn ʽUbadah
Usayd ibn Hudayr

References

Sources 
 

Sahabah killed in battle
Sahabah who participated in the battle of Uhud
Sahabah hadith narrators
Sahabah martyrs